Spituk or Pitok is a census town located in the Leh district of Ladakh, India.

References 

Cities and towns in Leh district